Michał Franciszek Zaleski (born July 14, 1952) is a Polish politician. Zaleski is the current mayor of Toruń as of November 18, 2002.

Biography
Zaleski was born on July 14, 1952 in Jabłonowo Pomorskie, Poland. He attended the Nicolaus Copernicus University in Toruń and the University of Warsaw.

References

External links

Living people
1952 births
Nicolaus Copernicus University in Toruń alumni
University of Warsaw alumni